Seyed Ali Mousavi was the nephew of the 2009 Iranian presidential candidate and opposition leader Mir-Hossein Mousavi. Ali Mousavi died on December 27, 2009, during the 2009 Iranian election protests when he was reportedly shot in either the back or the chest by security forces during demonstrations against Mahmoud Ahmadinejad's contested election win. It was reported by abc news that before Seyed Ali Mousavi was killed, he got run over by a vehicle. According to france 24, reformist website Parlemannews claimed that Moussavi’s nephew died in the hospital after he was shot in the chest. However, according to the times, Mousavi’s nephew died prior to arriving at the hospital. 

Iranian filmmaker Mohsen Makhmalbaf, the official spokesman of Mir-Hossein Moussavi's campaign abroad, told BBC in an interview that Iranian secret police had called Seyed Ali Mousavi several times days before he was shot saying: "We will kill you."

After he died, his body was taken to Ebn-e Sina hospital, where protesters demonstrated outside. The protesters were broken up with tear gas by the Iranian security forces. It was later revealed that the government had removed his body and taken it to an undisclosed location in an attempt to crack down on the protests.

References

Al-Moussawi family
2009 deaths
Deaths by person in Iran
2009 in Iran
2009 riots
2009 Iranian presidential election protests
Mir-Hossein Mousavi
Protest-related deaths
Political repression in Iran
Year of birth missing